Aframomum pilosum is a species of plant in the ginger family, Zingiberaceae. It was first described by Daniel Oliver and Daniel Hanbury and got its current name from Karl Moritz Schumann.

References 

pilosum